Heroine of Hell is a 1996 film by Nietzchka Keene.  It has a narrative combining medieval iconography with a present-day storyline and stars Catherine Keener and Dermot Mulroney.  It was filmed on location in Miami and completed in 1995. It was distributed via PBS to member stations in 1996.

External links

1996 films
Films shot in Florida
1996 drama films
American drama films
1990s English-language films
1990s American films